The General Office of the Comptroller (Sindicatura General de la Nación) (SIGEN) is the Argentine institution that undertakes the internal control of the Argentine economy. The agency is part of the executive branch of Argentina, and was established in 1992 by Law No. 24,156. Since 2009 it has been presided over by Daniel Gustavo Reposo.

Notes and references

External links
 

Government of Argentina
1992 establishments in Argentina